The Boivin River is a tributary of the Turgeon River, flowing in the municipality of Eeyou Istchee Baie-James (municipality), in the administrative region of Nord-du-Québec, in Quebec, in Canada.

Geography 
The hydrographic slopes near the Boivin River are:
North side: Turgeon River;
East side: Hal Creek, Turgeon River;
South side: South River, La Sarre River;
West side: Patten River (Ontario).

The Boivin River has its source in the southeastern part of the township of Perron. The river crosses this township in the north direction and part of the canton of Boivin, in the lower part of its course.

The upper part of the river has three branches that merge to the southwest of the village of Val-Paradis, Quebec:
In particular, it drains two marsh areas;
 the second designated "Lavoie stream" has two sub-branches coming from the west, namely the Imbeau lake discharge and Oloron Lake; and the second is the Domena lake and Pajegasque lake. The resort is developed around Lake Pajegasque which is served by the path of the 4th and 5th ranks. The upper Lavoie River area is located north of the village of Normetal, Quebec, northeast of the Méloizes River. The Lavoie stream originates from a swamp zone located north of Chemin du Parallel, which delimits the administrative regions Abitibi-Témiscamingue and Eeyou Istchee Baie-James (municipality).
 The third comes from the west, draining the lands of 10th rank and 1st rank.

The Boivin River is the main tributary of Quebec's Turgeon River, which empties into the Harricana River; and it spills over the southern shores of James Bay, in Ontario. The Boivin River is the main Quebec tributary of Turgeon River.

Toponymy 

The toponym "Boivin River" and the "township of Boivin" are interrelated. This toponym evokes the work of life of Georges-Henri Boivin (1882–1926), Member of Parliament for Shefford County at the House of Commons, at the Canadian Parliament, from 1911 to 1926. He practiced the office of Minister of Customs and Excise in 1925. The canton of Boivin was proclaimed in 1940.

The toponym Boivin River was formalized on December 5, 1968, at the Bank of Place Names of the Commission de toponymie du Quebec.

Notes and references

See also 

Turgeon River, a watercourse
Harricana River, a watercourse
James Bay
Eeyou Istchee James Bay (Municipality)
List of rivers of Quebec

Rivers of Nord-du-Québec